Brian Kellock (born 1962) is a Scottish jazz pianist.

Biography

Born in Edinburgh, Kellock graduated with a B Music (Hons) from the University of Edinburgh in 1986. Since then, he has been establishing his position as one of the top piano players in the UK jazz scene, working with Herb Geller, Sheila Jordan, and Art Farmer.

From 1995, Kellock has been a member of Australian trumpeter James Morrison's Band.

His main project is his own Trio, which first appeared as the rhythm section for seminal Scottish band, the John Rae Collective, since 1988. This line-up, featuring Kenny Ellis on bass and John Rae on drums, has been performing together ever since. In 1998, the band released their first recording together – Something's Got To Give – a set of standards popularised by Fred Astaire.

Some of Kellock's popular songs played include: "You Must Believe in Spring," "Rhapsody in Blue," "The Way You Look Tonight," "Tokyo Express," "Let it Snow, Let it Snow, Let it Snow," "Lennies Pennies," "In the Bleak Midwinter," and "Young and Foolish."

Selected discography

As leader/co-leader

As sideman
John Rae – Where The Wild Clematis Grow
John Rae: Drums
Brian Kellock: Piano
Patrick Bleakley: Bass
Recorded 2020 – Thick Records NZ
John Rae's Celtic Feet
John Rae: Drums
Eilidh Shaw: Fiddle
Simon Thoumire: Concertina
Phil Bancroft: Sax
Brian Kellock: Piano
Mario Caribé: Bass
Recorded 1999 – Caber 010
Sylvia Rae – Close Enough
Sylvia Rae: Vocals
Brian Kellock: Piano
Warren Vaché: Trumpet
Kenny Ellis: Bass
Ronnie Rae: Bass (Tk3)
John Rae: Drums
Recorded 2002 – VocalbA vocl 001 (from caber music)
Hue & Cry – jazznotjazz
Michael Brecker: Tenor Sax
Mike Stern: Guitar
Randy Brecker: Trumpet
Tommy Smith: Tenor Sax
Danny Gottlieb: Drums
Brian Kellock: Piano
Recorded 1996 – Linn Records AKD 057
Spike Robinson – Stairway To The Stars
Spike Robinson – Tenor Saxophone
Brian Kellock – Piano
Ronnie Rae – String Bass
John Rae – Drums
Recorded at the Queen's Hall, Edinburgh 1990 – HEP Jazz – HEP CD 2049
Janusz Carmello – Portrait
Janusz Carmello: Trumpet & Pocket Trumpet
Brian Kellock: Piano
John Hartley: String Bass
Tony McLennan: Drums
Jimmy Wood: Alto Sax
Phil Bancroft: Tenor Sax
Gordon Cruickshank: Bar Sax
Keith Hutton: Trombone
Recorded 1989 HEP Records – HEP CD 2044
Nigel Clark Quintet – Worldwide Sound
Nigel Clark: Guitars
Tim Garland: Saxophones
Brian Kellock: Piano/Keyboards
Ewen Vernel: Bass
Mike Bradley: Drums
Recorded 1996 Sienna Records SNA 1001
Tam White/Boz Burrell – Groove Connection
Tam White: Voice
Boz Burrell: Basses
Brian Kellock: Piano/Keyboards
Neil Warden: Guitar
John Henderson: Drums
Russel Cowieson: Tenor Sax
Tom McNiven: Trumpet
Alec Phillips: Trombone
Recorded 2000 Catalyst Records CD2002.

References

External links
Artist's website

Alumni of the University of Edinburgh
Scottish jazz pianists
1962 births
Living people
21st-century British pianists